The Informationist, by Taylor Stevens, is the first novel in the Vanessa Michael Munroe series, about a young woman raised in Cameroon as the daughter of American missionaries. She has a life-changing experience at the age of 14 when she takes up with an infamous gunrunner and his mercenary crew. Later in life she becomes a dealer of information, sort of a private eye for the 21st century, where she works for governments and corporations dealing in the specialized information of Central Africa.

The book was translated into Italian, Spanish, Hebrew, Polish, Turkish and Dutch.

Film adaptation
In October 2012, James Cameron's production company Lightstorm Entertainment picked up film rights to the book with plans for Cameron to direct the adaptation for 20th Century Fox. The film is said to begin shooting after Cameron finishes the second and third installments of his Avatar series.

References 

2011 American novels
American thriller novels
Novels set in Africa
Crown Publishing Group books